The first government of Pedro Sánchez was formed on 7 June 2018, following the latter's election as Prime Minister of Spain by the Congress of Deputies on 1 June and his swearing-in on 2 June, as a result of the success of a motion of no confidence against Mariano Rajoy.

The cabinet comprised members of the PSOE (including its sister party, the Socialists' Party of Catalonia, PSC) and a number of independents. It was nicknamed as the "beautiful government" by the media, because its composition was purposely leaked in a slow cascade of surprise, well-received announcements in the days prior to its formation in order to heighten the positive media coverage on the new appointments. It also became the government with the most female ministers in the country's history and in the world at the time, with 11 out of 17 ministries held by women or 64.7% of the total.

The government was defeated in the parliamentary vote of the 2019 General State Budget bill, prompting Sánchez to dissolve the Cortes and call a snap election; as a result, this was the shortest Spanish government since the country's transition to democracy—not counting acting periods—lasting for 10 months before an election was held. It was automatically dismissed on 29 April 2019 as a consequence of the April 2019 general election, but remained in acting capacity until the next government was sworn in.

Investiture

Cabinet changes
Sánchez's first government saw a number of cabinet changes during its tenure:

On 13 June 2018, Màxim Huerta stepped down as Minister of Culture and Sports after it was revealed that he had been sanctioned for using a shell corporation as a means for tax avoidance between 2006 and 2008. He was succeeded by José Guirao.
On 11 September 2018, Carmen Montón announced her resignation as Minister of Health, Consumer Affairs and Social Welfare after evidence was uncovered that she had obtained a master's degree from the King Juan Carlos University without attending most classes, amid other irregularities. She was succeeded by María Luisa Carcedo.

From 29 April 2019, Sánchez's cabinet took on acting duties for the duration of the government formation process resulting from the April 2019 general election. This lasted for an estimated  days and saw a new general election being held in the meantime. A number of ministers renounced their posts throughout this period, with the ordinary duties of their ministries being transferred to other cabinet members as a result of Sánchez being unable to appoint replacements while in acting role.

On 21 May 2019, Meritxell Batet was elected President of the Congress of Deputies of the 13th Legislature, a position incompatible with her post as acting Minister of Territorial Policy and Civil Service. Luis Planas, acting Minister of Agriculture, Fisheries and Food, took on the ordinary discharge of duties of Batet's vacant ministry.
On 30 November 2019, Josep Borrell renounced his position as acting Minister of Foreign Affairs, European Union and Cooperation in order to become High Representative of the Union for Foreign Affairs and Security Policy in the Von der Leyen Commission. Margarita Robles, acting Minister of Defence, took on the ordinary discharge of duties of Borrell's vacant ministry.

Council of Ministers
The Council of Ministers was structured into the offices for the prime minister, the deputy prime minister, 17 ministries and the post of the spokesperson of the Government.

Departmental structure
Pedro Sánchez's first government was organised into several superior and governing units, whose number, powers and hierarchical structure varied depending on the ministerial department.

Unit/body rank
() Secretary of state
() Undersecretary
() Director-general
() Autonomous agency
() Military & intelligence agency

Notes

References

External links
Governments of Spain 2011–present. Ministers of Mariano Rajoy and Pedro Sánchez. Historia Electoral.com (in Spanish).

2018 establishments in Spain
2020 disestablishments in Spain
Cabinets established in 2018
Cabinets disestablished in 2020
Council of Ministers (Spain)